Daniel Sandoval (born July 13, 1994) is an American BMX Dirt and Freestyle rider from Corona, California.

Contest history 
 2011 NASS - Park: 2nd
 2012 FISE Costa Rica - Park: 2nd Place
 2012 FISE France -  Spine: 3rd Place
 2013 FISE France -  Park: 2nd Place
 2013 FISE France -  Spine: 1st
 2013 X Games Munich - Park: 3rd
 2013 Play BMX Contest - Park: 1st
 2013 Cuerna Style - Dirt: 1st
 2014 Red Bull Dirt Conquers - 2nd
 2014 Vans Off The Wall Invitational - 1st Place
 2014 X Games Austin - Park: 3rd
 2015 X Games Austin -  Park: 1st
 2015 Fise Montpellier - Park: 1st
 2015 FISE Chengdu - Park: 3rd Place
 2015 NASS - Park: 3rd
 2016 Nitro World Games - BMX Triple Hit: 4th
 2016 X Games Minneapolis - Park: 3rd
 2016 NASS - Dirt: 3rd
 2017 Toronto X-Jam - 3rd
 2018 Toronto X-Jam - 1st
 2018 FISE UCI World Cup Edmonton - Park: 4th
 2019 UCI C1 Costa-Rica - Park: 2nd
 2019 X Games Minneapolis - Park: 4th / Best Trick: 2nd
 2019 FISE Xperience Le Havre - Park: 3rd
 2019 Palladium Freestyle Slap - Park: 1st
 2022 Nitro World Games - Triple Hit: 1st

References

External links
 

1994 births
Living people
American male cyclists
BMX riders
X Games athletes
Sportspeople from Corona, California